The 2003–04 Wake Forest Demon Deacons men's basketball team represented Wake Forest University during the 2003–04 NCAA Division I men's basketball season.

Roster

Schedule

References

Wake Forest Demon Deacons men's basketball seasons
Wake Forest
Wake Forest